Babacar Gaye (born 31 January 1951) is a Senegalese Army General who was the former United Nations Secretary-General's Special Representative and Head of the United Nations Multidimensional Integrated Stabilization Mission in the Central African Republic (MINUSCA). Prior to this appointment of 16 July 2014, he was the Special Representative and Head of the United Nations Integrated Peacebuilding Office for the Central African Republic (BINUCA).

Career
In August 2010, he was appointed by United Nations Secretary-General Ban Ki-moon as the Military Advisor for Peacekeeping Operations in New York UN Headquarters replacing Nigeria's Lieutenant General Chikadibia Isaac Obiakor.

In 2005, The Secretary-General, Kofi Annan, appointed Lieutenant-General Babacar Gaye (Senegal) as the new Force Commander of the United Nations Organization Mission in the Democratic Republic of the Congo (MONUC). He replaced Major-General Samaila Iliya (Nigeria) and was the third Force Commander of MONUC and the second commander from Senegal after General Mountaga Diallo. In 2010 he was succeeded by India's Chander Prakash.

In January 2004, he was assigned as Ambassador of Senegal in Germany by president Abdoulaye Wade.

Babacar Gaye was promoted to the rank of Brigade General in 2000, when he became Chef d'état-major général des armées (Chief of the Defence Staff) from May 2000 to August 2003 and to Divisional General (equivalent to Major General) in 2002.

Prior to this position, he led an extensive and distinguished military career, having served, among others, as Chief of Military Region from November 1997 to May 2000.

From 1994 to 1997, he served as the Director of the Senegalese foreign intelligence agency.

In 1991, he served as commander of the Senegalese contingent in the Operation Desert Storm in Saudi Arabia based in Dhahran.

He also served as the Commander of the Senegalese contingent in the United Nations Interim Force in Lebanon (UNIFIL) from August 1979 to March 1980.  From July 1974 to February 1975, he served in the United Nations Emergency Force (UNEF).

Education

Babacar Gaye studied at the military academy École spéciale militaire de Saint-Cyr, where he enrolled in 1970 and graduated in 1972.

Lieutenant-General Gaye attended military courses at prestigious war colleges and military schools in France and Belgium.

He joined the École Supérieure de Guerre in Paris in 1986 and graduated in 1988.

Personal life

General Gaye is the son of former Secretary General of the OIC and Foreign Minister of Senegal Amadou Karim Gaye. 
He is married with two children.

References

External links
https://www.un.org/News/Press/docs/2013/sga1415.doc.htm
https://www.un.org/Depts/dpko/missions/monuc/facts.html

1951 births
Living people
Senegalese diplomats
Senegalese military personnel
United Nations military personnel
People from Saint-Louis, Senegal
École Spéciale Militaire de Saint-Cyr alumni
Generals
Ambassadors of Senegal to Germany